Eden was an electoral district of the Legislative Assembly in the Australian state of New South Wales from 1859 to 1894, including the town of Eden. From 1880 to 1894 it elected two members, with voters casting two votes and the first two candidates being elected. In 1894, single-member electorates were introduced statewide and Eden was split into Eden-Bombala (including Bombala) and Bega. Eden-Bombala was abolished in 1904 and absorbed into Monaro and Bega.

Members for Eden

Election results

References

Former electoral districts of New South Wales
1859 establishments in Australia
Constituencies established in 1859
1894 disestablishments in Australia
Constituencies disestablished in 1894